The 2009 Omaha mayoral election was held on May 12, 2009. Incumbent mayor Mike Fahey declined to seek a third term. The election was won by city councilman Jim Suttle, who defeated former mayor Hal Daub by a two percent margin.

Candidates
Randy William Brown
Hal Daub - former Omaha mayor, former Congressman, 1988 and 1990 Senate candidate (Republican)
Mort Sullivan
Jim Suttle - Omaha city councilman (Democrat)
Jim Vokal - Omaha city councilman (Republican)

Election results

Primary
The primary was held on April 7, 2009

General

References

Omaha
2009 Nebraska elections
2009